(or the Great Charter of Ireland) is an issue of the English Magna Carta (or Great Charter of Liberties) in Ireland. King Henry III of England's Charter of 1216 was issued for Ireland on 12 November 1216 but not transmitted to Ireland until February 1217; it secured rights for the Anglo-Norman magnates in Ireland. The Charter was reissued in 1217 as in England. It was in effect the application of Magna Carta to Ireland, with appropriate substitutions (such as "Dublin" for "London", and "Irish Church" for "Church of England").

The only known copy of the Charter was once to be found in the Red Book of the Dublin Court of Exchequer, a manuscript volume compiled in the fourteenth century. The Red Book was destroyed in the explosion at the Four Courts in Dublin, in 1922, but the Charter had been recorded by H. F. Berry in Early Statutes of Ireland (1907). Magna Carta Hiberniae 1216 (1 Hen. 3) is now a retained statute in the Republic of Ireland under the Statute Law Revision Act 2007, s.2(2)(a), Schedule 1.

Further reading 
 Early Statutes of Ireland H. F. Berry, 1907
 Magna Charta Hiberniae, pp. 31–33, H.G. Richardson, Irish Historical Studies

References

External links 
Magna Charta Hiberniae 1216 (Great Charter of Ireland)

Statute Law Revision Act 2007

1210s in law
Irish laws
Law of Northern Ireland
Legal history of Ireland
1216 in Europe
13th century in Ireland
Medieval charters and cartularies